"Forever" is a song by Danish electropop singer Medina from her second English-language album Forever. The song was released as the album's lead single on 13 April 2012. "Forever" was translated into English from Medina's Danish number-one single "For altid". It samples the song "The One" (in the original Danish-language version "For altid" - "Vi to"). "Forever" was written by Medina, Providers, Engelina Andrina, and Nazerine Henderson, and it was produced by Providers.

Music video
The music video was shot in New York and was directed by Michael Sauer Christensen. The video premiered on 7 May 2012 on her official myvideo.de channel and a day later on the labels YouTube channel.

Track listing
Digital download
"Forever" – 3:31

Digital EP
"Forever" – 3:33
"Forever" (Jean Elan Remix) – 6:44
"Forever" (DJ Tonka's True House Mix) – 4:31
"Forever" (Tagteam Terror Remix) – 4:36

US digital download — remixes (part 1)
"Forever" (Tagteam Terror Remix) – 4:37
"Forever" (Jean Elan Radio Mix) – 3:33
"Forever" (Jean Elan Remix) – 6:44
"Forever" (DJ Tonka's True House Radio Mix) – 3:15
"Forever" (DJ Tonka's True House Mix) – 4:32
"Forever" (Svenstrup & Vendelboe Remix) – 7:06

US digital download — remixes (part 2)
"Forever" (Trentemøller Remix) – 5:50
"Forever" (Morten Breum Remix) – 6:28
"Forever" (Roger Sanchez & S.co Remix) –  6:16

Charts

Release history

References

2012 singles
Medina (singer) songs
Synth-pop ballads
Songs written by Rasmus Stabell
Songs written by Jeppe Federspiel
2012 songs
EMI Records singles
Songs written by Engelina
Songs written by Medina (singer)